Raúl José Espíndola (born September 13, 1958 in Rafaela, Santa Fe, Argentina) is a former footballer. He played for clubs in Argentina, Chile and Ecuador.

Teams
 Colón de Santa Fe 1982
 Deportivo Morón 1983–1986
 Argentinos Juniors 1987–1988
 Cobreloa 1989
 Deportivo Morón 1989–1990
 Talleres (RE) 1991–1992
 Deportivo Quito 1992–1993

External links
 

1958 births
Living people
Argentine footballers
Argentine expatriate footballers
Argentinos Juniors footballers
Club Atlético Colón footballers
S.D. Quito footballers
Cobreloa footballers
Talleres de Remedios de Escalada footballers
Chilean Primera División players
Argentine Primera División players
Expatriate footballers in Chile
Expatriate footballers in Ecuador
Association football forwards
People from Rafaela
Sportspeople from Santa Fe Province